This is a list of Nigerian films released in 2007.

Films

See also
List of Nigerian films

References

External links
2007 films at the Internet Movie Database

2007
Lists of 2007 films by country or language
Films